The Chairman of Committee Outreach is a Democratic United States Senator and member of the party leadership of the United States Senate responsible for representing the views of Senate committee chairs to the chamber's Democratic leadership.

Chairman of Committee Outreach

 Bernie Sanders (2016–present)

References

Leaders of the United States Senate